9921 Rubincam, provisional designation , is a stony asteroid from the inner regions of the asteroid belt, approximately 4 kilometers in diameter. It was discovered on 2 March 1981, by American astronomer Schelte Bus at the Siding Spring Observatory in Australia, and later named after American geophysicist David Rubincam.

Orbit and classification 

Rubincam is a stony S-type asteroid that orbits the Sun in the inner main-belt at a distance of 2.2–2.5 AU once every 3 years and 8 months (1,338 days). Its orbit has an eccentricity of 0.06 and an inclination of 2° with respect to the ecliptic.
A first precovery was taken at Palomar Observatory in 1953, extending the body's observation arc by 28 years prior to its official discovery at Siding Spring.

Physical characteristics

Lightcurves 

In February 2010, two rotational lightcurves of Rubincam were obtained from photometric observations at the Palomar Transient Factory in California. Lightcurve analysis gave a rotation period of 8.01 and 8.014 hours with a brightness amplitude of 0.33 and 0.31 in magnitude, respectively.

Diameter and albedo 

According to the survey carried out by NASA's Wide-field Infrared Survey Explorer with its subsequent NEOWISE mission, Rubincam measures 4.250 kilometers in diameter and its surface has an albedo of 0.204, while the Collaborative Asteroid Lightcurve Link assumes a standard albedo for stony asteroids of 0.20 and calculates a diameter of 4.1 kilometers with an absolute magnitude of 14.3.

Naming 

This minor planet was named after David Rubincam (born 1947), an American solid-earth geophysicist and planetary geodynamicist at NASA's Goddard Space Flight Center in Greenbelt, Maryland. He was the first to study the influence of the radiation recoil effects on an asteroid's rotation period and spin axis, which he later named the Yarkovsky–O'Keefe–Radzievskii–Paddack effect or YORP effect for short. The official naming citation was published by the Minor Planet Center on 28 September 2015.

References

External links 
 Asteroid Lightcurve Database (LCDB), query form (info )
 Dictionary of Minor Planet Names, Google books
 Asteroids and comets rotation curves, CdR – Observatoire de Genève, Raoul Behrend
 Discovery Circumstances: Numbered Minor Planets (5001)-(10000) – Minor Planet Center
 
 

009921
Discoveries by Schelte J. Bus
Named minor planets
19810302